25 Scorpii (abbreviated to 25 Sco) is a star in the zodiac constellation of Scorpius, located about 920 light years away from the Sun. Its apparent magnitude is 6.71, so its apparent brightness is at the limit of human eyesight and can only be seen under excellent conditions, according to the Bortle scale. The object is moving closer to the Earth with a heliocentric radial velocity of −1.3 km/s. It is a proposed member of the Scorpius–Centaurus association.

This is an evolved bright giant with a spectral type of K0 II. It is about two times more massive and over twelve times wider than the Sun. The star is radiating 135 times the Sun's luminosity from its photosphere at an effective temperature of about 4,700 K.

References 

K-type bright giants
Scorpius–Centaurus association
Scorpius (constellation)
Scorpii, 25
Durchmusterung objects
151179
082140
6225